Petras Čėsna (born 20 February 1945) is a Lithuanian politician. He served as Ministry of Transport and Communications from 10 June 2005 to 18 July 2006.

He previously served as Minister of Economy from 12 July 2001 to 14 December 2004.

References 

Living people
1945 births
Place of birth missing (living people)
21st-century Lithuanian politicians
Ministers of Economy of Lithuania
Ministers of Transport and Communications of Lithuania